The Holdenville City Hall, at 102 Creek St. in Holdenville, Oklahoma, was built in 1910.  It was listed on the National Register of Historic Places in 1981.	

It is a red brick building with prominent stone quoins and other details, and has some architectural pretension, being perhaps Federal-influenced.  It was built by contractor Jack Britton for $8,700.  It was extended to the rear in 1951 to include a fire department.

Its NRHP nomination describes:It is architectually [sic] significant because it represents a departure from the typical Victorian Romanesque and Western Commercial styles prevalent in Oklahoma architecture. The attempt to reproduce a more classic style for a public building is the physical evidence of emerging order of a frontier town.

References

National Register of Historic Places in Hughes County, Oklahoma
Federal architecture in Oklahoma
Government buildings completed in 1910